The third season of Offspring, an Australian drama television series, began airing on 18 April 2012 on Network TEN. The season concluded after 13 episodes. Offspring is the story of the impossible loves of 30-something obstetrician Nina Proudman (Asher Keddie), and her fabulously messy family, as they navigate the chaos of modern life.

The season was released on DVD as a four disc set under the title of Offspring: The Complete Third Series on 1 August 2012.

Cast

Regular
Asher Keddie as Nina Proudman
Kat Stewart as Billie Proudman
Matthew Le Nevez as Patrick Reid
Deborah Mailman as Cherie Butterfield
Eddie Perfect as Mick Holland
Richard Davies as Jimmy Proudman
Linda Cropper as Geraldine Proudman
and John Waters as Darcy Proudman

Recurring
Jane Harber as Zara Perkich
Alicia Gardiner as Kim Akerholt
Lachy Hulme as Martin Clegg
Kate Atkinson as Renee
Henry and Jude Schimizzi Peart as Ray Proudman
Dan Spielman as Andrew Holland
Kate Jenkinson as Kate Reid
Matt Dyktynski as Tim
Jack Heanly as Ollie Harding
Kick Gurry as Adam

Guest starring
Alison Bell as Louise

Special guest starring
Gary McDonald as Phillip Noonan
Clare Bowditch as Rosanna Harding

Episodes

Reception

Ratings

References

2012 Australian television seasons